Tamer is a Turkish given name and surname. It means Competent soldier in Turkish. In Arabic (written as تامر), the name is more closely related to Tamr (as in dates).

Persons

Given name
 Tamer Abdel Hamid, Egyptian football player
 Tamer Ashor (born 1984), Egyptian singer and composer 
 Tamer Balci (1917–1993), Turkish actor
 Tamer Basar, Turkish control theorist 
 Tamer Başoğlu, (born 1938) Turkish sculptor
 Tamer Bayoumi, Egyptian taekwondo player and Olympian 
 Tamer El Said, Egyptian film director, producer, and writer
 Tamer El-Sawy, Egyptian tennis player
 Tamer Fernandes (born 1974), English football player 
 Tamer Hamed (born 1974), Egyptian swimmer and Olympian 
 Tamer Hassan, English actor of Turkish Cypriot descent
 Tamer Hosny, Egyptian singer-songwriter
 Tamer Karadağlı, Turkish actor
 Tamer Moustafa (born 1982), Egyptian basketball player
 Tamer Nafar, Arab Israeli rap artist
 Tamer Oyguç, Turkish professional basketball player
 Tamer Peker (born 1970), Turkish operatic baritone
 Tamer Şahin (born 1981), Turkish hacker
 Tamer Mohamed Tahoun (born 1977), Egyptian fencer
 Tamer Seckin, American gynecologist and laparoscopic surgeon 
 Tamer Tuna (footballer, born 1976), Turkish football player and coach
 Tamer Tuna (footballer, born 1991), Turkish football player
 Tamer Yiğit (born Tamer Özyiğitoğlu in 1942), Turkish actor

Family name
Chris Tamer (born 1970), American ice hockey player 
Georges Tamer, professor of philology and Arabic and Islamic studies
Kandy Tamer, Australian-born rugby league player of Lebanese origin
Tony Tamer, American businessman, founder and Co-CEO of H.I.G. Capital
Zakaria Tamer (born 1931), Syrian short story writer
Michel Temer, or Michel Miguel Elias Temer Lulia, Brazilian politician of Lebanese descent, President of Brazil
Taleedah Tamer, Saudi Arabian fashion model

Places
 Tamer, Iran, a village in Kerman Province, Iran
 Tamer, Golestan, a village in Golestan Province, Iran
 Tamer, Yazd, a village in Yazd Province, Iran
 Tamer, Btaaboura, a village in Koura, Lebanon

Other uses
 A person involved with lion taming
Tamer II, custom sail yacht
 TAMER, abbreviation for Training an Agent Manually via Evaluative Reinforcement, framework for transferring knowledge from human experts to automated AI agents.
Tamer Institute for Community Education, Palestinian educational organization

See also